

Standings

Group A

Group B

Final round 

* denotes overtime period

Classification 5–8

Semifinals

Final classification games

Seventh place game

Fifth place game

Bronze medal game

Final

Awards

Final ranking

External links
FIBA Americas U-18 Championship

2013-14
2013–14 in North American basketball
2013–14 in American basketball
2013–14 in South American basketball
2014
FIBA
2014
2014 in sports in Colorado
Sports competitions in Colorado Springs, Colorado